Camp Catawba was a summer camp for boys near the town of Blowing Rock in the Blue Ridge Mountains of North Carolina.  It was established in 1944 by Vera Lachmann (1904–1985), a poet, classicist and educator who emigrated from Germany in 1939.  In 1947 she was joined by the composer Tui St. George Tucker (1924–2004), who was the camp's music director.  Camp Catawba closed after the 1970 season.  The camp's nearest neighbors and indispensable practical aids were Mr. and Mrs. Ira W. and Sally Lentz Bolick, a mountain farm couple who descended from 18th-century German immigrants to America.

The forest was characterized by red oak and black locust, white pine and hemlock, as well as rosebay and Catawba rhododendron. The camp was also small in numbers—a maximum of 35 campers with an age range from 5 to 12. The boys attended for a full eight-week session.

Cash poor but culturally rich, Camp Catawba was guided by Vera Lachmann's idealism, her upbringing in Weimar Germany, and her finding at Catawba a haven from the torment of the Nazi era.

The boys at Catawba participated in traditional summer camp activities—ball games (on a sloping field), swimming (in a spring-fed pond and later in a modern pool), horseback riding (at stables in Blowing Rock), and hiking throughout the  Cone Estate (now the Moses H. Cone Memorial Park) which bordered the camp, and across Grandfather Mountain.

It was cultural programs that distinguished the camp. Vera Lachmann, who taught classics at Brooklyn College, told the campers the Iliad and the Odyssey in alternating summers, and directed a drama program that included plays by Aeschylus, Sophocles and Aristophanes; Shakespeare, Molière, Schiller and Yeats; and Nelly Sachs, who was a friend of hers.  The music program, under Tui St. George Tucker, consisted of a choir, an orchestra (with some parts adjusted according to the instrumentalists available), and private lessons, particularly on the recorder, her professional specialty.  Baroque (especially Bach) and early nineteenth century classical music (Haydn, Mozart, Beethoven, and Schubert) predominated.  The boys also performed Gregorian chants and other medieval music, and Tucker's arrangements of Negro spirituals.  Some arts counselors went on to become respected professionals including:  Eva Frankfurther, Thomas Locker, Hannibal Alkhas, Mark di Suvero, and Richard Pepitone.

Throughout Catawba's 27 summers, most of the campers and many of the staff came from New York City and Washington DC.   In the beginning many of the boys were the sons of parents who, like Lachmann, had fled Nazi Germany.  This also meant they were mostly Jewish - though Catawba was decidedly ecumenical and Lachmann read from both the Old and New Testaments at Sunday services.  An article from 1951 in The Blowing Rocket, the local weekly newspaper, captures Lachmann's idealism, as well as the anomaly of Catawba in the southern mountains at the time:  "There are in the camp today 29 boys from France, Germany, Norway, South American countries, New York and New Jersey, just as a sample of the various nationalities which the camp attracts.  Absolutely no race or creed is turned away, and soon possibly color will be no bar to admission to the camp."  Catawba integrated in 1964.

The physical heart of the camp was a chestnut lodge, constructed in 1913 before the blight decimated the American chestnut forests of the southern Appalachians.  In 1985 the National Park Service purchased the camp grounds from Tui St. George Tucker, who inherited the site from Vera Lachmann, and on Tucker's death the Park Service took possession of the property.  As of 2010, Park Service officials are deciding whether to preserve the chestnut lodge and how to interpret the camp to the public.

External links 
 Camp Catawba - Vera Lachmann Papers, Appalachian Collection, Appalachian State University:  (see under Special Collections, Appalachian Collection, list of manuscript collections, no. 214)
 Blue Ridge Parkway Foundation, Camp Catawba Fund:   (see under "Projects")
 Tui St. George Tucker website:  
 Tui St. George Tucker manuscript collection, Dept. of Music, Appalachian State University.  The collection is housed with the Camp Catawba - Vera Lachmann Papers:

Notes

Catawba
Buildings and structures in Watauga County, North Carolina
1944 establishments in North Carolina
Catawba